The 1990 Commonwealth Final was the seventh running of the Commonwealth Final as part of the qualification for the 1990 Speedway World Championship. The 1990 Final was run on 10 June at the Belle Vue Stadium in Manchester, England, and was part of the World Championship qualifying for riders from the Commonwealth nations.

Riders qualified for the Final from the Australian, British and New Zealand Championships.

1990 Commonwealth Final
10 June
 Manchester, Belle Vue Stadium
Qualification: Top 12 plus 1 reserve to the Overseas Final in Coventry, England

* Todd Wiltshire replaced Australian qualifier Stephen Davies. David Bargh and Gary Allan replaced New Zealand qualifiers Larry Ross and Craig Wilkie

References

See also
 Motorcycle Speedway

1990
World Individual
1990 in British motorsport
1990 in English sport
International sports competitions in Manchester
Commonwealth Final